Taiwan Star Telecom Corporation Limited, doing business as T Star for short, formerly Vibo Telecom Inc., is a 3G mobile network operator in Taiwan.

Its major operations are based in all city of Taiwan.

Services
Vibo was founded in 2000. It was awarded a licence in February 2002, and went live on 1 October 2005. Vibo's offers a common pricing plan for broadband and mobile that was introduced under the slogan On-Net/Off-net one price.

T-Star's network is UMTS (W-CDMA)  based in the 2.1 GHz band. Vibo offers it subscribers international roaming.

T-star also uses band 7 (2600MHZ) and Band 8 (900 MHz) for its LTE network.

Mobile Network Information

History
July 1999, the Preparatory Office of the Federal Telecommunications Co., Ltd. was established.

In April 2000, the Federal Telecommunications establishment is complete, the entire capital of NT 300 million yuan. May 2000, the Securities and Futures Commission approved the federal telecommunications public offering of stock. May 30, 2000, the federal telecommunications stocks listed on the Taiwan Stock Exchange under ticker 3157.

February 2002, the Federal Telecommunications third generation mobile communications service bidding bid. In October, the federal telecommunications board election, election hsiung Hsu Ren Jinbao Electronics representative as chairman. September 2003, the Federal Telecommunications was renamed by "Vibo Telecom Co., Ltd.."

September 2005, Vibo Telecom handle syndicated loan of NT $9.06 billion yuan, International Commercial Bank of China, Chinatrust Commercial Bank, JihSun International Commercial Bank, Ta Chong Commercial Bank, China Development Industrial Bank, Taiwan Cooperative Bank, jointly organized 23 bank syndicated loan. In December, the formal launch of the third generation mobile communications business services.

April 2006, over 10 million subscribers. Strategic alliance with Aurora Telecom operates a virtual mobile phone services (Mobile Virtual Network Operator, MVNO) business. December, Vibo "Granville Card" listed.

February 2007, the exclusive launch of Taiwan's first mobile phone money card "Granville travel card." March, launched the "VIBO cards." May, a joint venture with Tecom VMAX. In June, Taiwan's first 3G prepaid "VIBO one card" (威寶旺卡) listed. September, "Wei Wei Bao Tong Card" to new applications, launched the "Gateway Card Antenna Group and its subsidiaries," the world's most important industry-leading dual-card combination, non-contact inductive (NFC) technology, in cooperation with Union Bank with commercially available 3G handsets. December, and more than 4,000 completed WCDMA base station optimization.

July 2008, invested "威寶電通" pathway responsible for operating the phone. April 2009, breaking the one million subscribers. September, launched an exclusive "MyCard video card." November, completed Taiwan's first test network integration WCDMA / TD-SCDMA system resources. December, breaking the 1.5 million subscribers.

March 2010, Verbatim promote quality improvement, the goal of two million subscribers, revenue exceeded NT $12 billion. April, Verbatim organized the "action Taipei Technology Corridor" result presentation, Taiwan's first dual-brand system to complete the first 3.5G network of experimental stations and WiMAX certification. December, Vibo Telecom launched its own brand tablet "Vibo Vpad."

June 2011, 99 years VIBO net loss significantly improved operational robustness towards turnaround; Shareholders' Meeting re-election of directors and supervisors, general manager George Chou elected director. Vibo Telecom updated corporate identity, English trademark "VIBO" first letter "V" as the representative of the company to identify the word; George Chou said, V symbolizes "Victory (Victory)" and "V shape as a male wings soar upward eagle, a symbol of Verbatim will soar, a new start. July, Verbatim sell Taiwan the exclusive first Dual SIM Android smartphone. August, and China Trust Commercial Bank, Bank Group signed a five-year NT $ 5 billion million syndicated loan. November, Vibo Telecom to reduce capital by NT $ 12.804 billion yuan.

June 2012, Taiwan's first telecom operator Vibo Telecom and international communications software industry LINE work together. More than half of the entire network base station as HSPA + (21Mbps) 3.75G service building (six metropolitan areas to provide comprehensive HSDPA high-speed Internet service). The same month, according to the Consumers' Foundation commissioned NTU motor pen collected 100,000 mobile internet connection speed data (August 15, 2011 to May 28, 2012) survey results show that mobile data service quality and Verbatim three domestic telecom industry to keep pace, network quality of some places even better than three.

June 2013, Verbatim stores starting grid again, closer to consumer demand. The same month won the "Business Times", "2013 Taiwan's service industry big evaluation" chain telecommunications access class silver medal.

November 8, 2013, Campbell and Compal Electronics announced the sale to Taiwan Vibo Star mobile telecommunications, the end of April 2014 to be converted to equity conversion STAR holds 8% stake in Taiwan; share swap After Campbell Compal Electronics and Taiwan held each about Star 4% stake, no longer holds Vibo Telecom stake. January 23, 2014, Vibo Telecom board meeting, approved the resignation of General Manager George Chou, vice chairman William Yen also the general manager.

April 25, 2014, Vibo Telecom in Taiwan with the Stars shareholders meeting convened, after the two sides through share swap, Vibo Telecom will be converted into shares of Taiwan completed STAR 100% shareholding of subsidiaries.

June 3, 2014, the Board of Directors Chairman VIBO reelection, retiring Vibo Telecom hsiung Hsu, chairman of Taiwan's star director Wei Ying took Vibo Telecom Chairman; Vibo Telecom Board also resolved to change the headquarters business address, business address from the headquarters, Lane 358, 5th Floor, No. 36 Ruiguang to Taipei Neihu Road, Taipei, Tiding Avenue, 6th Floor, No. 239, Sec. June 4, 2014, Taiwan Star Telecom (台灣之星電信) Announces LTE concession license, Vibo Telecom now officially become Taiwan Star 100% shareholding of subsidiaries.

See also
 List of companies of Taiwan
 Chunghwa Telecom
 Taiwan Mobile
 Far EasTone

References

Mobile phone companies of Taiwan
Telecommunications companies established in 2000
Taiwanese companies established in 2000
Companies based in Taipei
Taiwanese brands